The following is a list of episodes of the British children's comedy Rentaghost, which aired on BBC1 from 6 January 1976 to 6 November 1984.
Selected episodes were last shown on the BBC from October 2003 until January 2004, as part of Dick & Dom's weekend morning shows on CBBC.

Series Overview

Episodes

Series 1 (January 1976)

Series 2 (May 1976)

Series 3 (1977)

Series 4 (1978)
This series was accompanied by a Christmas special, which was the last episode in the show to feature the characters of Fred Mumford and Hubert Davenport.

Christmas special (1979)

Series 5 (1980)

Series 6 (1981)

Series 7 (1982)

Series 8 (1983)

Series 9 (1984)

References 

Lists of British sitcom episodes
Lists of British children's television series episodes